Harry Hardt (born Hermann Karl Viktor Klimbacher Edler von Reichswahr, Pula, 4 August 1899 – Vienna, 14 November 1980) was an Austrian actor.  The son of a military officer, he initially planned a military career for himself, studying at a military academy and serving during World War I.  He later turned to acting, having a long career both in films and on television.

Selected filmography

 The Passion of Inge Krafft (1921)
 The Eternal Struggle (1921)
 The Women of Gnadenstein (1921)
 The False Dimitri (1922) - Fürst Leschinsky
 Frauenmoral (1923)
 Fräulein Raffke (1923)
 The Comedian's Child (1923)
 The Great Unknown (1924)
 The Hobgoblin (1924)
 Around a Million (1924)
 Nanon (1924) - Bruder der Dame (Brother of the Dame)
 The Wife of Forty Years (1925)
 Cock of the Roost (1925)
 Upstairs and Downstairs (1925)
 The Dealer from Amsterdam (1925)
 Ship in Distress (1925)
 In the Name of the Kaisers (1925)
 The Clever Fox (1926)
 Sword and Shield (1926)
 The Uncle from the Provinces (1926)
 The Field Marshal (1927)
 Grand Hotel (1927)
 The White Slave (1927)
 A Murderous Girl (1927)
 Did You Fall in Love Along the Beautiful Rhine? (1927)
 Endangered Girls (1927)
 Children's Souls Accuse You (1927)
 Storm Tide (1927)
 The Woman in the Cupboard (1927)
 The Gypsy Baron (1927)
 Klettermaxe (1927)
 Casanova's Legacy (1928)
 Hungarian Rhapsody (1928)
 Five Anxious Days (1928)
 High Treason (1929)
 The Wonderful Lies of Nina Petrovna (1929)
 What's Wrong with Nanette? (1929)
 The Veil Dancer (1929)
  The Man Without Love  (1929)
 Hungarian Nights (1929)
 The Copper (1930)
 Danube Waltz (1930)
The Citadel of Warsaw (1930)
 The White Devil (1930)
  Grock (1931)
 In the Employ of the Secret Service (1931)
 The Stranger (1931)
 Crime Reporter Holm (1932)
 The Secret of Johann Orth (1932)
 Spoiling the Game (1932)
 The Invisible Front (1932)
 The Naked Truth (1932)
 The Countess of Monte Cristo (1932)
 Under False Flag (1932)
 Happy Days in Aranjuez (1933)
 Spies at Work (1933)
 The Island (1934)
 At the Strasbourg (1934)
 Gypsy Blood (1934)
 The Old and the Young King (1935)
 If It Were Not for Music (1935)
 My Life for Maria Isabella (1935)
  A Night of Change (1935)
 Uncle Bräsig (1936)
 Escapade (1936)
 The Impossible Woman (1936)
 The Beggar Student (1936)
The Man Who Was Sherlock Holmes (1937)
The Chief Witness (1937)
 Signal in the Night (1937)
 Maria Ilona (1939)
  My Aunt, Your Aunt (1939)
 The Scoundrel (1939)
 Falstaff in Vienna (1940)
 A Man Astray (1940)
 Beloved World (1942)
 Two Happy People (1943)
 The War of the Oxen (1943)
 Vienna 1910 (1943)
 Viennese Girls (1945)
  Maria Theresa (1951)
  Everything for Father (1953)
 Irene in Trouble (1953)
 Grandstand for General Staff (1953)
 The Emperor Waltz (1953)
The Eternal Waltz (1954)
 The Silent Angel (1954)
 Sarajevo (1955)
 Espionage (1955)
 Marianne of My Youth (1955)
 The Royal Waltz (1955)
 Our Crazy Aunts (1961)
 The Mimosa Wants to Blossom Too (1976)
Derrick - Season 05, Episode 03: "Abendfrieden" (1978)

External links

Portraits of Harry Hardt at Virtual History

1899 births
1980 deaths
Austrian male film actors
Austrian male silent film actors
People from Pula
Austro-Hungarian military personnel of World War I
20th-century Austrian male actors